Asphaera is a genus of flea beetles in the family Chrysomelidae, containing some 130 species, found in North America, Central America, and the Neotropics.

Selected species

 Asphaera abdominalis (Chevrolat, 1835)
 Asphaera bitaeniata (Jacoby, 1880)
 Asphaera cruciata (Olivier, 1808)
 Asphaera discicollis Jacoby, 1905
 Asphaera fuscofasciata Jacoby, 1905
 Asphaera lustrans (Crotch, 1873) (shiny flea beetle)
 Asphaera magistralis
 Asphaera meticulosa
 Asphaera nobilatata (Fabricius, 1887)
 Asphaera paralleloptera (Bezzi, 1913)
 Asphaera quadrifasciata
 Asphaera reflexicollis Bechyne
 Asphaera separata (Harold, 1881)
 Asphaera umbraticus (Olivier, 1808)
 Asphaera vernalis Jacoby, 1905
 Asphaera weyrauchi Bechyne

asphaera paralleloptera

References

External links

 

Alticini
Chrysomelidae genera
Articles created by Qbugbot
Taxa named by Philogène Auguste Joseph Duponchel
Taxa named by Louis Alexandre Auguste Chevrolat